is a Japanese actress who was one of the country's biggest stars of the 20th century.

Biography
Wakao began her career contracted to Daiei Studios in 1951 as part of the fifth "New Face" group. She has gone on to appear in over 100 feature films, plus numerous television movies and series. She was a favorite actress of director Yasuzo Masumura, starring in 20 of his films. In addition to her many collaborations with Masumura, she was a favorite of Kon Ichikawa, having starred or co-starred in seven of the director's works. She appeared in Kenji Mizoguchi's A Geisha and Street of Shame. She also appeared in Yasujirō Ozu's Floating Weeds. 
Yuzo Kawashima made three films Women Are Born Twice, The Temple of Wild Geese and The Graceful Brute with her.

Wakao married architect Kisho Kurokawa in 1983. They did not have children. In 2007, both ran unsuccessful campaigns for seats in the upper house of the Japanese Parliament, before Kurokawa died in October of that year.

Selected filmography

Films

Television

Awards and nominations

References

External links

 
 

Japanese film actresses
1933 births
Living people
20th-century Japanese actresses
21st-century Japanese actresses
Actresses from Tokyo